Events in the year 2019 in Guinea.

Incumbents
President: Alpha Condé
Prime Minister: Ibrahima Kassory Fofana

Events

Planned – 2019 Guinean legislative election

Deaths

4 February – Mohamed Ofei Sylla, footballer (b. 1974).

References

 
2010s in Guinea
Years of the 21st century in Guinea
Guinea
Guinea